Scattered may refer to:

Music
 Scattered (album), a 2010 album by The Handsome Family
 "Scattered" (The Kinks song), 1993
 "Scattered", a song by Ace Young
 "Scattered", a song by Lauren Jauregui
 "Scattered", a song by Green Day from Nimrod

Other uses
 Scattered (rave), a rave party based in Sydney, Australia
 "Scattered" (Battlestar Galactica), a 2005 Battlestar Galactica episode
 Scattered radiation
 Scattered space, a property of topological spaces

See also
Scatter (disambiguation)